Oropi is a rural settlement located in the Bay of Plenty region of the North Island of New Zealand. It is located 20 kilometres south of Tauranga and 43 kilometres north of Rotorua. It has been suggested that the word Oropi is the Māori language equivalent of Europe. This is derived from the 1860s when government forces were based in the area at the time of the Battle of Gate Pā.

The New Zealand Ministry for Culture and Heritage gives a translation of "place of covering up" for Ōropi.

Oropi is mainly a farming community of both agriculture and horticulture ranging from kiwifruit orchards to dairy farms. Recently there has been some subdivision of farms into lifestyle blocks to take advantage of views of the coastline towards the Coromandel Peninsula and islands in the Bay of Plenty including Karewa Island, Mayor Island (Tuhua) and Motiti Island.

Local facilities include a 9-hole golf course, hot pools, a paintball course and mountain bike tracks. The Oropi Memorial Hall and Community Centre includes a 170 square metre auditorium. The nearby Otanewainuku Forest, managed by the Department of Conservation, includes three short public walks.

A sink hole developed on Oropi Road in August 2019, caused by erosion from a stream. The sinkhole was fixed in January 2020.

Demographics
The SA1 area is part of the Waiorohi statistical area.

The SA1 area had a population of 225 at the 2018 New Zealand census, an increase of 60 people (36.4%) since the 2013 census, and an increase of 63 people (38.9%) since the 2006 census. There were 75 households, comprising 108 males and 120 females, giving a sex ratio of 0.9 males per female. The median age was 43.7 years (compared with 37.4 years nationally), with 36 people (16.0%) aged under 15 years, 39 (17.3%) aged 15 to 29, 123 (54.7%) aged 30 to 64, and 27 (12.0%) aged 65 or older.

Ethnicities were 93.3% European/Pākehā, 12.0% Māori, 1.3% Pacific peoples, and 1.3% other ethnicities. People may identify with more than one ethnicity.

Although some people chose not to answer the census's question about religious affiliation, 64.0% had no religion, and 28.0% were Christian.

Of those at least 15 years old, 33 (17.5%) people had a bachelor's or higher degree, and 27 (14.3%) people had no formal qualifications. The median income was $34,700, compared with $31,800 nationally. 33 people (17.5%) earned over $70,000 compared to 17.2% nationally. The employment status of those at least 15 was that 105 (55.6%) people were employed full-time, 39 (20.6%) were part-time, and 3 (1.6%) were unemployed.

Waiorohi statistical area

Waiorohi had a population of 2,520 at the 2018 New Zealand census, an increase of 330 people (15.1%) since the 2013 census, and an increase of 567 people (29.0%) since the 2006 census. There were 825 households, comprising 1,254 males and 1,266 females, giving a sex ratio of 0.99 males per female. The median age was 42.1 years (compared with 37.4 years nationally), with 492 people (19.5%) aged under 15 years, 468 (18.6%) aged 15 to 29, 1,260 (50.0%) aged 30 to 64, and 300 (11.9%) aged 65 or older.

Ethnicities were 91.2% European/Pākehā, 15.1% Māori, 1.1% Pacific peoples, 1.9% Asian, and 1.3% other ethnicities. People may identify with more than one ethnicity.

The percentage of people born overseas was 17.1, compared with 27.1% nationally.

Although some people chose not to answer the census's question about religious affiliation, 59.2% had no religion, 28.9% were Christian, 1.1% had Māori religious beliefs, 0.1% were Muslim, 0.2% were Buddhist and 1.4% had other religions.

Of those at least 15 years old, 396 (19.5%) people had a bachelor's or higher degree, and 309 (15.2%) people had no formal qualifications. The median income was $35,200, compared with $31,800 nationally. 384 people (18.9%) earned over $70,000 compared to 17.2% nationally. The employment status of those at least 15 was that 1,104 (54.4%) people were employed full-time, 387 (19.1%) were part-time, and 48 (2.4%) were unemployed.

Education

The school has a community garden and has converted a donated shipping container into an outdoor kitchen with a hand-painted forest mural on the outer wall.

References

Western Bay of Plenty District
Populated places in the Bay of Plenty Region